Phèdre (Phaedra) is an opera by the French composer Jean-Baptiste Lemoyne, first performed at Fontainebleau on 26 October 1786. It takes the form of a tragédie lyrique in three acts. The libretto, by François-Benoît Hoffman, is based on the Greek myth of the obsessive love of Phaedra for her stepson Hippolytus.

Roles

Recordings 
Concert de la Loge Olympique, Julien Chauvin
Orfeo Orchestra Purcell Choir, György Vashegyi. Palazzeto Bru Zane (2020)

References

Sources
 Original libretto on BNF Gallica

Operas
French-language operas
Operas by Jean-Baptiste Lemoyne
1786 operas
Operas based on works by Jean Racine
Works based on Phèdre